Waitaria Bay is a locality in the Marlborough region of New Zealand. It lies on the northern side of Kenepuru Sound in the Marlborough Sounds.

The town is one of the most isolated in the South Island to have a school. The nearest shop is about 50 minutes drive, the nearest small town, Havelock, is two hours drive, and the nearest main centre, Blenheim, is two and a half hours drive.

Education
Waitaria Bay School is a coeducational full primary (years 1-8) school with a decile rating of 10 and a roll of 20. The school opened in 1897.

References

Populated places in the Marlborough Region
Populated places in the Marlborough Sounds